Ángel Daniel González Berroterán (born 26 December 1994) is a Venezuelan professional footballer who plays as a forward for Venezuelan Primera División side Monagas.

Career
González began his career with Venezuelan Primera División side Monagas. He first appeared with the first-team in August 2015 when he was an unused sub for a Copa Venezuela defeat to Tucanes. His professional debut arrived on 28 February 2016 during a 3–0 loss versus Deportivo Táchira in the Primera División, prior to scoring his first goal in his second start for Monagas against Ureña on 20 April. After two goals in seven appearances, González was loaned to fellow Primera División team Atlético Socopó in July 2017. He went on to score one goal in nine games for Atlético Socopó as they were relegated.

Career statistics
.

References

External links

1994 births
Living people
Place of birth missing (living people)
Venezuelan footballers
Association football forwards
Venezuelan Primera División players
Monagas S.C. players
Atlético Socopó players